This page details statistics of the Christy Ring Cup.

General performances

Wins by team

Participation by team

Year by Year

Debut of teams

Teams

By Semi-Final Appearances

Unbeaten sides

 Eight teams have won the Christy Ring Cup unbeaten: 
 Westmeath had 5 wins and 1 draw in 2007.
 Carlow had 4 wins and 1 draw in 2009.
 Kerry had 4 wins in 2011.
 Kerry had 4 wins in 2015.
 Meath had 4 wins and 1 draw in 2016.
 Meath had 5 wins in 2019.
 Kildare had 3 wins in 2020.
 Offaly had 3 wins in 2021.
 Kildare had 6 wins in 2022.

Final success rate

 One team has appeared in the final twice, being victorious on both occasions:
 Meath (2016), (2019)

Consecutive participations

Wicklow have the record number of consecutive participations in the Christy Ring Cup, taking part in the first eighteen tournaments until being relegated in 2022.

Biggest wins

 The most one sided finals:
21 points – 2021: Offaly 0-41 - 2-14 Derry
18 points – 2006: Antrim 5-13 - 1-07 Carlow
16 points – 2022: Kildare 2-29 - 1-19 Mayo
14 points – 2018: Kildare 3-19 - 1-11 London
13 points – 2011: Kerry 2-21 - 2-08 Wicklow

Defending the cup

A total of sixteen tournaments have been played and only one team has been successful in retaining the cup. (most teams were promoted after winning the Christy Ring Cup, therefore they were unable to defend the cup):
 Carlow on one attempt out of two (2009)

Player records

Top Scorers Overall

Top Scorers In The Final

Miscellaneous

Most Christy Ring Cup winners' medals: 3
Joe Clarke (Westmeath) – 2005, 2007, 2010
Paul Greville (Westmeath) – 2005, 2007, 2010
Conor Jordan (Westmeath) – 2005, 2007, 2010
Enda Loughlin (Westmeath) – 2005, 2007, 2010
Darren McCormack (Westmeath) – 2005, 2007, 2010
Andrew Mitchell (Westmeath) – 2005, 2007, 2010
Brendan Murtagh (Westmeath) – 2005, 2007, 2010
John Shaw (Westmeath) – 2005, 2007, 2010
Ronan Whelan (Westmeath) – 2005, 2007, 2010
Richard Coady (Carlow) - 2008, 2009, 2017
Paul Divilly (Kildare) - 2014, 2018, 2020
Niall Ó Muineacháin (Kildare) - 2014, 2018, 2020

Records
Hurling records and statistics